Koiak 26 - Coptic Calendar - Koiak 28

The twenty-seventh day of the Coptic month of Koiak, the fourth month of the Coptic year. On a common year, this day corresponds to December 23, of the Julian Calendar, and January 5, of the Gregorian Calendar. This day falls in the Coptic season of Peret, the season of emergence. This day falls in the Nativity Fast.

Commemorations

Saints 

 The martyrdom of Saint Psote, Bishop of Psoi

References 

Days of the Coptic calendar